There was a by-election for the United Kingdom House of Commons in Hamilton on Wednesday 31 May 1978.  It was caused by the death of the incumbent Labour Party Member of Parliament Alex Wilson on 23 March of that year.

Within days of Wilson's death, The Glasgow Herald described the by-election as 'the biggest battle the Government has faced in Scotland since the last General Election'. The SNP, which had previously won the seat in a by-election in 1967, were reported to see the contest as an important test of where political opinion in Scotland stood. The SNP's prospective candidate, Margo MacDonald, had a high profile as a former MP and had been working in the constituency for three years. There was also initial uncertainty as to whom Labour would select as a candidate. Wilson's death was unexpected and it had been assumed he would fight the seat at the next general election. John Maxton, nephew of James Maxton, who lived in the constituency, was suggested as a possibility, but he had already been selected to fight Glasgow Cathcart for Labour at the next election.

As the opening game of the 1978 FIFA World Cup was on Thursday 1 June, the by-election was held one day earlier, on the Wednesday. All by-elections since then have been held on a Thursday.

The Labour candidate was George Robertson, who defeated SNP candidate Margo MacDonald, with an increased majority.

It was one of a series of significant Labour victories over the SNP in 1978 which halted their rise at that time.

See also
Hamilton (UK Parliament constituency)
List of United Kingdom by-elections (1950–1979)

References

External links
 Report on the by-election by Thames TV

Hamilton by-election
1970s elections in Scotland
Politics of South Lanarkshire
Hamilton by-election
By-elections to the Parliament of the United Kingdom in Scottish constituencies
Hamilton by-election